Carl-Julius Cronenberg (born 30 July 1962) is a German politician of the Free Democratic Party (FDP) who has been serving as a member of the Bundestag from the state of North Rhine-Westphalia since 2017.

Early life and career 
Cronenberg studied economics in Lausanne. Since 1991 he has been managing partner of Julius Cronenberg Sophienhammer, JCS, based in Arnsberg-Müschede.

Political career 
For the 2017 federal elections, Cronenberg competed in the Hochsauerlandkreis constituency and finally moved into the 19th German Bundestag via the North Rhine-Westphalia state list of the FDP. He is a member of the Committee on Labour and Social Affairs and a deputy for the Committee on European Union Affairs.
 
In addition to his committee assignments, Cronenberg has been a member of the German delegation to the Franco-German Parliamentary Assembly since 2022.

References

External links 

  
 Bundestag biography 

1962 births
Living people
Members of the Bundestag for North Rhine-Westphalia
Members of the Bundestag 2017–2021
Members of the Bundestag 2021–2025
Members of the Bundestag for the Free Democratic Party (Germany)